The 1958–59 Toronto Maple Leafs season was Toronto's 42nd season in the National Hockey League (NHL). The Maple Leafs made it to the Stanley Cup Final, but lost to the Montreal Canadiens.

Offseason

Regular season

Final standings

Record vs. opponents

Schedule and results

Playoffs

(2) Boston Bruins vs. (4) Toronto Maple Leafs

Stanley Cup Finals

Player statistics

Regular season
Scoring

Goaltending

Playoffs
Scoring

Goaltending

Awards and records

Transactions

See also
 1958–59 NHL season

References

External links

Toronto Maple Leafs season, 1958-59
Toronto Maple Leafs seasons
Tor